The following are California State Militia units that were active between 1861 and 1865 during the American Civil War.

Volunteer Companies of the California State Militia 1860–1866

Alameda County
Alvarado Guard, Company F, 5th Infantry Regiment, 2nd Brigade, Alvarado, 1863–1866
Brooklyn Guard, Unattached Company, 2nd Brigade.  San Leandro, 1865–1866
Hayward Guard, Unattached Company,  2nd Brigade. Hayward, 1864–1868
Jackson Guard, Unattached Company, 2nd Brigade. Oakland, 1865–1866
Oakland Home Guard, Oakland, (1861–1863)
 Oakland Guard, Company C, 1st Infantry Battalion, 2nd Brigade. Oakland, (1863–1866)

Alpine County
Markleville Guard, changed to Alpine Rifles, Unattached Company, 4th Brigade. Markleville, 1864–1866

Amador County
Amador Hussars, Unattached Company, 4th Brigade. Jackson, 1861–1862
Amador Mountaineers, Jackson 1861, became Company C, 1st Regiment California Volunteer Infantry
Ione City Guard, Unattached Company, 4th Brigade.  Ione 1863–1866
Jackson Guard, Unattached Company, 4th Brigade. Jackson 1863-1866
Sutter Creek Volunteers, Unattached Company, 4th Brigade. Sutter Creek 1861-1862
Sutter Creek Guard, Unattached Company C, 4th Brigade.  Sutter Creek, 1864–1866
Volcano Blues, Company C, 4th Infantry Regiment, 4th Brigade. Volcano 1861–1866
Volcano Guard, Volcano, 1858–1861

Butte County
Bangor Guard, Unattached Company, 5th Brigade. Bangor, 1864–1866
Butte County Dragoons, Oroville 1861
Butte Mounted Rifles, Oroville, 1861
Chico Light Infantry, Chico, 1863–1866
California Volunteers, Oroville, 1861  became part of 1st Regiment California Volunteer Infantry
 Oroville Guard, Oroville, 1856–1857, 1861–1868

Calaveras County
Angels Guard, Company H, 3rd Infantry Regiment, 3rd Brigade.  Angel's Camp, 1862–1868
Mokelumne Hill Rifles, Unattached Company, 3rd Brigade.  Mokelumne Hill, 1863–1866
Union Guard, Company C, 2nd Battalion, 3rd Brigade.  Poverty Bar, 1861–1866
Union Guard, Unattached Company, 3rd Brigade.  Copperopolis, 1864–66

Contra Costa County
Contra Costa Guard, Company G, 1st Cavalry Battalion, 2nd Brigade.  San Pablo, 1863–1866

Del Norte County
Crescent City Guard, Unattached Company, 2nd Brigade, 6th Division.  Crescent City, 1861-1864

El Dorado County
Banks Guard, Company E, 2nd Infantry Battalion, 4th Brigade. Smith's Flat, 1863–1866
Coloma Greys, Coloma, 1857–1862, disbanded after most of its men joined  the Second and Fourth Regiments of California Volunteers.
El Dorado Mountaineers, Company G, 2nd Infantry Battalion, 4th Brigade.  El Dorado 1863-1866
Georgetown Union Guard, Company A, 2nd Infantry Battalion, 4th Brigade.  Georgetown, 1863–1868
National Guard, Company D, 2nd Infantry Battalion, 4th Brigade.  Placerville, 1863–1866
Placerville City Guard, Company B, 2nd Infantry Battalion, 4th Brigade. Placerville, 1863–1866
Placerville Guard, 4th Brigade, 1st Division. Placerville, 1862

Fresno County
 None

Humboldt County
Arcata Guard, Company B, 6th Brigade. Arcata, 1862-1867
Eureka Rifles, Attached to 6th Brigade.  Eureka, 1862–1864
Humboldt Volunteers, Attached to 2nd Brigade. Hydesville, 1860
Mounted Volunteers, Attached to 2nd Brigade. Humboldt County, 1861

Lake County
 None

Lassen County
Honey Lake Rangers, Unattached Cavalry Company, 5th Brigade.  Susanville, 1864–1866

Los Angeles County
Los Angeles Greys, attached to 1st Brigade, 1st Division.  Los Angeles, 1861
Los Angeles Guard, Attached to 1st Brigade.  Los Angeles, 1853-1881
Los Angeles Mounted Rifles, Attached to 1st Brigade. Los Angeles, 1861
Monte Mounted Rifles, El Monte, 1861

Marin County
Lincoln Cavalry, Company M, 1st Cavalry Regiment, 2nd Brigade.  Tomales, 1864–1866
Washington Rifles, Tomales, 1864

Mariposa County
Coulterville Rifles, Unattached Company, 3rd Brigade. Coulterville, 1864–1866

Mendocino County
 None

Merced County
 None

Mono County
Esmerelda Rifles, Attached to 3rd Brigade. Aurora, 1862
Hooker Light Infantry, Attached to 3rd Brigade.  Aurora, 1863

Monterey County
Conner Guard, Attached to First Brigade.  Monterey, 1863–1866

Napa County
Napa Guard, Unattached company, 2nd Brigade.  Napa City & County, 1861–1868
Napa Rangers, Company L, 1st Cavalry Regiment, 2nd Brigade.  Napa City & County, 1864–1868
Washington Light Artillery, Unattached Co., 2nd Brigade.  Napa City & County, 1863–1866

Nevada County
Company "H", Nevada City, 1861  It became Company G, 1st Regiment California Volunteer Infantry
Eureka Rangers, Unattached Company, of the Fourth Brigade.  Moores Flat, 1863–1866
Grass Valley Union Guard, Company A, 5th Infantry Battalion, 4th Brigade. Grass Valley, 1863–1865
 Howell Zouaves, Company E, 5th Infantry Battalion, 4th Brigade. Grass Valley, 1865–1872
Little York Union Guard, Company C, 5th Infantry Battalion, 4th Brigade. You Bet, 1863–1867
Nevada Light Guard, Unattached Company, 4th Brigade.  Nevada City, 1863–1878
Nevada Rifles, Unattached Company, 2nd Brigade, 4th Division. Nevada City, 1858–1863
San Juan Guard or Bridgeport Union Guard, Unattached Company, 4th Brigade.  North San Juan, 1863–1866

Placer County
Auburn Greys, Company A, 1st Infantry Battalion, 4th Brigade.  Auburn, 1861–1868
Forest Hill Guard, Company B, 1st Infantry Battalion, 4th Brigade.  Forest Hill, 1861–1866
Lincoln & Virginia Union Guard, Company D, 1st Infantry Battalion, 4th Brigade.  Lincoln, 1863–1866
Mountain Volunteers, Forest Hill, 1861,  disbanded, when many company members joined the Volunteer Infantry for active duty.
Pacific Guard, Company C, 1st Infantry Battalion, 4th Brigade. Dutch Flat, 1861–1868
Pilot Hill Rangers, Company F, 2nd Infantry Battalion, 4th Brigade.  Pilot Hill, 1864–1866
Placer Cadets, Company F, 1st Infantry Battalion, 4th Brigade.  Iowa Hill, 1865–1866
Placer County Mountaineers, Forest Hill, 1861, disbanded, when many of the company's members joined the Volunteer Infantry for active duty.
Placer Guard, Iowa Hill, 1861–1862
Shields Guard, Company C, 2nd Infantry Regiment, 2nd Brigade. Forest Hill, 1861
Union Corps, Company D, 1st Infantry Battalion, 4th Brigade.  Michigan Bluff, 1862–1863
Yankee Jims Rifles, Company E, 1st Infantry Battalion, 4th Brigade.  Yankee Jim's, 1863–1867

Plumas County
Indian Valley Rifles, Taylorville 1863  Never an effective unit.
Union Guard, Quincy 1863-1864  Never an effective unit.

Sacramento County
Baker Guard, Company H, 4th Infantry Regiment, 4th Brigade. Sacramento, 1863–1866
Emmet Guard, Company E, 4th Infantry Regiment, 4th Brigade.  Sacramento, 1864-1872
Granite Guard, Unattached Company, 4th Brigade. Folsom 1861–1863
Independent City Guard, Company A, 2nd Battalion, 4th Brigade. Sacramento, 1856–1880
 National Guard, Company D, 4th Infantry Regiment, 4th Brigade. Sacramento, 1862–1867
Sacramento Hussars, Unattached Company, 4th Brigade. Sacramento, 1863–1874
Sacramento Light Artillery, Sacramento, 1864–1880
Sacramento Sharp Shooters, Company F, 4th Infantry Regiment, 4th Brigade. Sacramento, 1863–1866
Turner Rifles, Company E, 4th Regiment of Infantry, 4th Brigade. Sacramento, 1863–1864
Walnut Grove Union Guard, Unattached Company, 4th Brigade. Walnut Grove 1863-1866
Washington Rifles, Sacramento City & County, 1861  It became Company E, 1st Regiment California Volunteer Infantry

San Bernardino County
San Bernardino Rangers, Attached to 1st Brigade.  San Bernardino, 1861–1862

San Diego County
San Diego Guard, Attached to 1st Brigade, 1st Division. San Diego, 1856-1863

San Francisco County
Black Hussars then "San Francisco Hussars",  San Francisco City & County, 1859–1862
San Francisco Hussars, Company B, 1st Cavalry Regiment, 2nd Brigade. San Francisco City & County, 1862–1891  Formerly the Black Hussars.
Carbineers, Company G, First Infantry Regiment, Second Brigade. San Francisco City & County, 1859–1862
California Grenadiers, Company D, 6th Infantry Regiment, 2nd Brigade. San Francisco City & County, 1864–1866
California Musketeers, Company H, 6th Infantry Regiment, 2nd Brigade. San Francisco City & County, 1864–1866
California Rifles, 1863 ?
California Rifles (French Guard), Company H, First Infantry Regiment, Second Brigade. San Francisco City & County, 1860-1862
California Tigers, Company D, 2nd Infantry Battalion, 2nd Brigade. San Francisco City & Co., 1865–1869
Columbian Guard, Company D, 1st Infantry Regiment, 2nd Brigade. San Francisco City & County, 1863–1869
Ellis Guard, Company C, 6th Infantry Regiment, 2nd Brigade. San Francisco City & County, 1863–1866
Ellsworth Guard Zouaves, Company B, 1st Regiment Artillery, 2nd Brigade. San Francisco City & County, 1862–1866
Ellsworth Rifles, Company K, 1st Infantry Regiment, 2nd Brigade.  San Francisco City & County, 1861–1872
Ellsworth Zouaves Cadettes, Unattached Company, 2nd Brigade.  San Francisco City & County, 1864–1866
Emmett Life Guard, Unattached Company, 2nd Brigade. San Francisco City & County, 1862–1866
Eureka Guard, Company I, 1st Artillery Regiment, 2nd Brigade.  San Francisco City & County, 1865–1869
Federal Guard, Unattached Company, 2nd Brigade. San Francisco City & County, 1865–1866
First California Guard, Company A, Light Battery, 1st Artillery Regiment, 1st Brigade.  San Francisco City & County, 1849–1875
First Light Dragoons, Company A, 1st Cavalry Battalion, 2nd Brigade.  San Francisco City & County, 1852–1880
Franklin Light Guard, Company E, 1st Artillery Regiment, 2nd Brigade.  San Francisco City & County, 1861–1873
Germania Guard, Company G, 6th Infantry Regiment, 2nd Brigade.  San Francisco City & County, 1864–1866
Governors Guard, Unattached Company, 2nd Brigade.  San Francisco City & County, 1865–1866
Grant Guard, Company B, 2nd Infantry Battalion, 2nd Brigade.  San Francisco City & County, 1864–1867
Hibernia Greens, Unattached Company, 2nd Brigade. San Francisco City & County, 1865–1866
Hugh O'Neil Guard, Company K, 2nd Infantry Regiment, 2nd Brigade.  San Francisco City & County, 1863–1866
Independent National Guard, Company C, 1st Infantry Regiment, 2nd Brigade. San Francisco City & County, 1859–1880
Jackson Dragoons, Company C, 1st Cavalry Regiment, 2nd Brigade. San Francisco City & County, 1863–1881
Liberty Guard, Company F, 1st Regiment Artillery, 2nd Brigade.  San Francisco City & County, 1864–1866
Lincoln Guard, Company A, 2nd Infantry Battalion, 2nd Brigade. San Francisco City & County, 1864–1855
Wolfe Tone Guard, San Francisco City & County, 1862
Marion Rifles, Unattached Company, 2nd Brigade. San Francisco City & County,  1852–1861
Meagher Guard (Irish Invincible), Company E, 2nd Infantry Battalion, 2nd Brigade.  San Francisco City & County, 1862–1866
Mechanics Rifles, Company F, 2nd Artillery Regiment, 2nd Brigade.  San Francisco City & County, 1864–1866
Mission Guard, Unattached Company, 2nd Infantry Regiment, 2nd Brigade. Mission Dolores, 1864–1866
Montgomery Guard, Company B, 1st Infantry Battalion, 2nd Brigade. San Francisco City & County, 1859–1880
McClelland Guard to Dec. 1865, thereafter "Excelsior Guard", Company B, 1st Infantry Battalion, 2nd Brigade. San Francisco City & County, 1862–1866
McMahon Guard, Company B, 2nd Infantry Regiment, 2nd Brigade. San Francisco City & County, 1859-1879
San Francisco Cadets, Company K, 1st Regiment Artillery, 2nd Brigade. San Francisco City & County, 1863-1884
San Francisco Light Guard, Company F, 1st Infantry Regiment, 2nd Brigade. San Francisco City & County, 1858–1880
San Francisco Tiralleurs, Company F, 6th Infantry Regiment, 2nd Brigade. San Francisco City & County, 1864–1880
San Francisco Jaegers, Company K, 6th Infantry Regiment, 2nd Brigade. San Francisco City & County, 1864–1866
Seward Guard, Unattached Company, 2nd Brigade. San Francisco City & County, 1865–1866
Sheridan Guard, Company C, 2nd Infantry Battalion, 2nd Brigade. San Francisco City & County, 1864–1866
Shields Guard, Company C, 2nd Infantry Regiment, 2nd Brigade. San Francisco City & County, 1862–1869
Sigel Rifles, Company B, 6th Infantry Regiment, 3rd Brigade. San Francisco City & County, 1861–1866
State Guard, Company A, 1st Infantry Regiment, 2nd Brigade. San Francisco City & County, 1863–1869
Tittel Zouaves, Company I, 6th Infantry Regiment, 2nd Brigade. San Francisco City & County, 1864–1866
Union Guard (Gatling Battery), Company A, 1st Regiment Artillery, 2nd Brigade. San Francisco City & County, 1861–1881
Washington Continental Guard, Company D, 1st Infantry, 2nd Brigade. San Francisco City & County, 1855–1862
Washington Light Infantry, Company D, 1st Infantry, 2nd Brigade.  San Francisco City & County, 1862–1878  Formerly Washington Continental Guard.

San Joaquin County
Castoria Guard, Unattached Company, 3rd Brigade.  French Camp, 1864–1866
Linden Light Dragoons, Unattached Company, 3rd Brigade. Linden, 1863–1864
Mokelumne Light Dragoons, Unattached Company, 3rd Brigade. Lockeford, 1863–1867
San Joaquin Mounted Rifles, Unattached Company, 1st Brigade, 3rd Division. Knight's Ferry, 1858–1862
Stockton Blues, Stockton, 1859–1861
Stockton City Guard, Unattached Company, 3rd Brigade. Stockton, 1864–1866
Stockton Light Artillery, Unattached Company, 3rd Brigade. Stockton, 1864–1868
Stockton Light Dragoons, Unattached Company, 3rd Brigade. Stockton, 1862–1866
Stockton Union Guard, Unattached Company, 3rd Brigade.  Stockton, 1861–1866

San Luis Obispo County
none

San Mateo County
Jefferson Cavalry, Company H, 1st Cavalry Regiment, 2nd Brigade. Redwood City, 1864–1866

Santa Barbara County
 none

Santa Clara County
Alviso Rifles (Guards), Company C, 5th Infantry Battalion, 2nd Brigade.  Alviso Mills, 1863–1866
Burnett Light Guard, Company I, 1st Cavalry Regiment, 2nd Brigade.  San Jose, 1864–1866
Gilroy Guard, Company E, 5th Infantry Regiment, 2nd Brigade.  Gilroy, 1863–1866
Johnson Guard, Unattached Company, 2nd Brigade. San Jose, 1865–1866
National Guard, San Jose, 1857–1861,  disbanded when many of its members joined the regular army.
National Light Artillery, Unattached Company, 2nd Brigade.  San Jose, 1863
New Almaden Cavalry, Company K, 1st Cavalry Regiment, 2nd Brigade. New Almaden, 1864–1866
San Jose Volunteers, San Jose, 1861  Became Company D, 1st Regiment California Volunteer Infantry
Redwood Cavalry, Company E, 1st Cavalry Regiment, 2nd Brigade. McCarthysville, 1863–1866
San Jose Zouaves, Company H, 1st Artillery Regiment, 2nd Brigade. San Jose, 1862–1866
Santa Clara Light Infantry, Company F, 1st Artillery Regiment, 2nd Brigade. Santa Clara, 1861–1864  Renamed Santa Clara Guard in 1864.
Santa Clara Guard, Company H, 5th Infantry Regiment, 2nd Brigade. Santa Clara, 1864–1866
Santa Clara Zouaves, Unattached Company, 2nd Brigade. Santa Clara, 1863–1865
Union Guard, Company A, 5th Infantry Regiment, 2nd Brigade. San Jose, 1861–1866

Santa Cruz County
Butler Guard, Company G, 5th Infantry Regiment, 2nd Brigade.  Santa Cruz, 1863–1866
Santa Cruz Cavalry, Company F, 1st Cavalry Regiment, 2nd Brigade.  Santa Cruz, 1863–1866
Santa Cruz Volunteers, Company H, 1st Cavalry Regiment, 2nd Brigade.  Santa Cruz, 1861
Watsonville Guard, Company D, 5th Infantry Regiment, 2nd Brigade.  Watsonville, 1863–1868

Shasta County
 Lyon Light Infantry, Company C, 5th Brigade.  Shasta, 1863–1868
 Trueman Head Rifles, Company F, 5th Brigade.  French Gulch, 1863–1866

Sierra County
Allegheny Guard, 3rd Infantry Battalion, 4th Brigade. Allegheny, 1863–1866
Forest Rifles, Company C, 3rd Infantry Battalion, 2nd Brigade. Forest City 1854–1866
Gibsonville Blues, Company E, 3rd Infantry Battalion, Second Brigade.  Gibsonville, 1858–1862, disbanded after most of its members joined California Volunteer Regiments as individuals.
La Porte Guard, Unattached Company later Company C, 4th Infantry Battalion, 4th Brigade. La Porte 1863–1866
Minnesota Guard, Company C, 4th Brigade.  Minnesota City, 1863–1866
Mountain Rangers, Unattached Company, 4th Brigade.  Sierraville, 1864–1866
National Guard, Company E, 1st Battalion, 2nd Brigade.  Downieville, 1857–1866
Sierra Greys, La Porte, 1858–1861  Became Company F, First Regiment of Infantry, California Volunteers
Table Rock Union Guard, Company G, 7th Infantry Regiment, 4th Brigade. Howland Flat, 1864–1866
Union Guard, Unattached Company, 4th Brigade.  Eureka 1864–1866

Siskiyou County
Scott Valley Guard, Unattached Company, 5th Brigade.  Scott Valley, 1863,  disbanded the same year.
Siskiyou Light Guard, Company D, 5th Brigade. Yreka, 1863–1866

Solono County
Benicia Guard (Starsfield Guard from late 1862), Company G, 2nd Brigade.  Benicia, 1862–1866
Lincoln Artillery, Unattached Company, 2nd Brigade.  Vallejo, 1864–1866
Maine Prairie Rifles, Unattached Company, 2nd Brigade.  Maine Prairie, 1863–1866
McClellan Guard, Company I, 1st Artillery, 2nd Brigade. Vallejo, 1863–1864  Identified as a Copperhead Company its officers were mustered out of service.
Suisun Cavalry, Company D, 1st Cavalry Regiment, 2nd Brigade.  Suisun City, 1863–1866
Vallejo Rifles, Unattached Company, 2nd Brigade, Vallejo, 1861–1866

Sonoma County
Bloomfield Guard, Company C, 1st Infantry Battalion, 2nd Brigade. Bloomfield, 1862–1866
Emmet Guard (Emmet Rifles after early 1862), Company F, 2nd Infantry Regiment, 2nd Brigade. Petaluma, 1861–1866
Petaluma City Guard, Company  E, 1st Infantry Battalion, 2nd Brigade. Petaluma 1864–1866
Petaluma Guard, Company  D, 1st Infantry Battalion, 2nd Brigade. Petaluma, 1856–1866
Russian River Rifles, Company B, 1st Infantry Battalion, 2nd Brigade. Healdsburg, 1862–1866
Sotoyame Guard, Healdsburg, 1858–1861,  disbanded in 1861 after a rapid decline in membership, in this pro Southern area.
Washington Guard, Company A, 1st Infantry Battalion, 2nd Brigade. Santa Rosa, 1862–1866

Sutter County
Butte Mountain Rangers, Company D, 7th Infantry Regiment, 4th Brigade.  South Butte Mountains, 1863–1866
Company "A", Yuba City, 1861  Organized but disbanded due to lack of available arms.

Stanislaus County
Franklin Guard, Company F, 3rd Infantry Regiment, 3rd Brigade.  Knight's Ferry, 1862–1866
Stanislaus Guard, 1st Brigade, 3rd Division.  Knight's Ferry, 1860–1862,   disbanded in 1862.

Tehama County
Lassen Rangers, Unattached Company, 5th Brigade.  Red Bluff, 1863–1866

Tuolumne County
Grant Guard, Company G, 1st Infantry Battalion, 3rd Brigade. Shaw's Flat, 1863–1866
Jamestown Guard, Company D, 1st Infantry Battalion, 3rd Brigade.  Jamestown, 1862–1866
Sigels Guard, Company B, 1st Infantry Battalion, 3rd Brigade. Sonora, 1862–1866
Tuolumne Guard, Company E, 3rd Infantry Regiment, 3rd Brigade.  Montezuma, 1862–1866
Tuolumne Home Guard, Company A, 3rd Infantry Regiment, 3rd Brigade.  Columbia, 1861–1866
Tuolumne Home Guard, Company C, 3rd Infantry Regiment, 3rd Brigade.  Chinese Camp, 1862–1866

Trinity County
Douglas City Rifles, Unattached Company, 5th Brigade. Douglas City, 1861–1866
Halleck Rifles, Unattached Company, 5th Brigade.  Weaverville, 1862–1866
Union Guard, Unattached Company, 2nd Brigade. Weaverville, 1861–1862

Tulare County
Tulare Home Guard, Unattached Company, 3rd Brigade.  Visalia, 1863–1866

Yolo County
Washington Guard, Company G, 4th Infantry Regiment, 4th Brigade.  Washington 1863-1866
Woodland Guard, Company K, 4th Infantry Regiment, 4th Brigade.  Woodland, 1863–1866
Yolo Union Cavalry, Unattached Company, 4th Brigade.  Woodland, 1863–1866

Yuba County
California Zouaves, 1st Brigade, 5th Division.  Marysville 1861–1862
Downey Guard, Unattached Company, 1st Brigade, 5th Division.  Timbuctoo 1860–1861
Hooker Guard, Company B, 7th Infantry Regiment, 4th Brigade.  Oregon House, 1863–1866
Marysville Rifles, Company B, 4th Infantry Regiment, 4th Brigade.  Marysville, 1859–1866
Saragossa Light Guard, Company H, 7th Infantry, 4th Brigade.  Marysville, 1865–1866
Union Guard, Company A, 7th Infantry Regiment, Fourth Brigade.  Marysville, 1863–1866
Yuba Light Infantry, Unattached Company, 4th Brigade.  Camptonville 1863–1866

References

Sources
 The California State Military Museum, California Militia and National Guard Unit Histories, Index to Militia Units of the State of California 1850–1881
 Inventory of the Military Department. Militia Companies Records, 1849–1880

 
California
Civil War
California in the American Civil War
1860 establishments in California